Nikos Dabizas (born 3 August 1973) is a Greek former professional footballer who played as a defender for Newcastle United, Leicester City, Olympiacos and AEL. He was also in Greece's 2004 European Football Championship winning squad.

Career

Pontioi Veria
Dabizas spent his days playing football and helping in his father's company. His first contact with football came when he was sixteen, although he never dreamt of becoming a professional footballer. However, fate had other plans for him. He played for a year as an amateur at the local team of Amydeo called Hermes, which was enough to give him the ticket to a team in the third division and a professional contract, as he joined Pontioi Veria, as an 18-year-old, where he remained for three consecutive seasons, playing one year on the third division and two in the second. His big career break came when he was 21. He got an offer from Olympiacos, one of the biggest teams in Greece.

Olympiacos
He moved to Piraeus and helped his new team win the Greek championship twice, something they hadn't done in ten years. He also took part in his first UEFA Champions League games. After three-and-a-half seasons with Olympiacos he received an offer from Newcastle United, which opened him the doors to the English football fields, in the Premier League.

Newcastle United
In March 1998, Dabizas signed with Newcastle United for a fee of £2 million. His initial four-year contract, which was to expire in 2002, was renewed well ahead of time, and was to see Dabizas in the team, until June 2004. He famously scored Newcastle's winning goal in the 1–0 away victory in the Tyne–Wear derby against Sunderland at the Stadium of Light on 24 February 2002. Whilst at Newcastle United, he played in both the 1998 and 1999 FA Cup Finals.

Being left out of the first squad since the spring of 2003, Dabizas had no option, but to seek a transfer. A car accident prevented him from moving during the summer transfer window. Still, the decision to move was enforced, as he did not see any action when the new season started. He accepted an offer from Leicester City in January 2004.

Leicester City and Euro 2004
Dabizas played regularly for Leicester as they battled to stay in the Premier League, their efforts were inadequate and the team was relegated to the Championship. It seemed like it was going to turn out to be a very disappointing season, but it was far from over. Dabizas was selected for the 2004 European Football Championship Greek squad but never saw any action as an injury kept him on the sidelines. To everyone's surprise, Greece went on to win the tournament, ending a season that had many turning points. After Euro 2004, Dabizas chose to stay at Leicester despite being entitled to a relegation release clause in his contract. Dabizas scored twice during his spell at Leicester, one in the league against Sheffield United, and another in the FA Cup against Charlton Athletic.

AEL
Dabizas was released by Leicester at the end of his contract in May 2005. In August 2005, he signed a three-year deal with AEL. In 2007, he won Larissa's second Greek cup, after a great personal performance in the final, being the captain. Dabizas, playing in UEFA Cup, reaching the group stage by eliminating Blackburn Rovers. In 2008–09 season, the team finished 5th in Super League and won an UEFA Europa League place, but were eliminated in the second qualifying round by KR Reykjavík (1–1,0–2). Here, Dabizas found Stelios Venetidis and Stelios Giannakopoulos two teammates in the Greece national team for UEFA Euro 2004, as well as former Newcastle United teammate Laurent Robert. After a poor start to the 2009–10 season, Larissa finally finished in mid-table, and Dabizas signed a one-year contract extension, meaning that his spell with Larissa would be the longest with any club in his career and also where he played most. He announced his retirement in 2011.

Managerial career

Panathinaikos
Dabizas joined Panathinaikos on 17 May 2013 as the club's football director until 11 November 2014, and he returned in this position on 17 May 2018 until 18 October 2019.

Omonia
Dabizas joined Cypriot club Omonia on 30 March 2016 as football director.

Honours 
AEL
Greek Cup: 2007
Greek Super Cup: runner-up 2007

Greece
 UEFA Euro: 2004

References

External links
 
 

1973 births
Living people
People from Amyntaio
Greek footballers
Greek Macedonians
Association football defenders
Olympiacos F.C. players
Newcastle United F.C. players
Leicester City F.C. players
Athlitiki Enosi Larissa F.C. players
UEFA Euro 2004 players
UEFA European Championship-winning players
Premier League players
English Football League players
Greece international footballers
Super League Greece players
Panathinaikos F.C. non-playing staff
Greek expatriate footballers
Expatriate footballers in England
Greek expatriate sportspeople in England
FA Cup Final players
Footballers from Western Macedonia